Strange Gardens is a 2003 French drama film based on the eponymous novel by Michel Quint.

Cast 
 Jacques Villeret - Jacques Pouzay
 André Dussollier - André Desingy
 Thierry Lhermitte - Thierry Plaisance
 Benoît Magimel - Émile Bailleul
 Suzanne Flon - Marie Gerbier
 Isabelle Candelier - Louise

References

External links 

2000s war drama films
2003 drama films
2003 films
2000s French films